Insworke is a hamlet in the parish of Millbrook (before 1869 in the parish of Maker) in southeast Cornwall, England, UK. A fair and annual market were held here from 1319.

Antiquary William Hals wrote:

References

External links

Hamlets in Cornwall